Sainte-Anne-de-la-Rochelle is a community in Quebec, Canada, situated within the Regional County Municipality of Le Val-Saint-François in the administrative region of Estrie.

It is served by Quebec Routes 243 and 220. Route 220 has its beginning point in Sainte-Anne-de-la-Rochelle.

Demographics

Population

Language
Mother tongue (2011)

See also
List of municipalities in Quebec

References

External links

Municipalities in Quebec
Incorporated places in Estrie